The Charles Brooks House is a historic house at 309 High Street in Medford, Massachusetts.  It is a -story wood-frame house with brick side walls, each of which has two chimneys built into it.  The house is estimated to have been built around 1765, early in the Federal period.  It has exterior details that are now rare in Medford, including corner quoining and cornice detailing.  The house is most notable, however, for its association with Rev. Charles Brooks, a prominent figure in local history.

Brooks (1795-1872) played an active role in the development of the educational systems of Massachusetts, including its normal schools.  He also cowrote an early history of the city.

The house was listed on the National Register of Historic Places in 1975.

See also
National Register of Historic Places listings in Medford, Massachusetts
National Register of Historic Places listings in Middlesex County, Massachusetts

References

Houses on the National Register of Historic Places in Medford, Massachusetts
Houses in Medford, Massachusetts